County Durham, officially simply Durham, is a ceremonial county in North East England. The ceremonial county was created from the historic County Palatine of Durham in 1853. 

In 1974, a large part of the county was lost when Gateshead, Jarrow, South Shields, Washington, Sunderland, Houghton-le-Spring, Hetton-le-Hole and other surrounding villages and towns near these settlements were moved into the Tyne and Wear county, forming the modern boroughs of Gateshead, South Tyneside and Sunderland. However, the county gained the Startforth Rural District from the North Riding of Yorkshire, including the villages of Cotherstone, Mickleton and Romaldkirk. In 1996, the county gained part of the abolished ceremonial county of Cleveland and also saw Darlington along with Stockton-on-Tees and Hartlepool become unitary authorities but remaining part of the county for ceremonial purposes. The county town is the city of Durham. 

The county borders Cumbria to the west, North Yorkshire to the south, and Tyne and Wear and Northumberland to the north. Boundaries initially aligned with the historic county, stretching between the rivers Tyne and Tees. The County Borough of Teesside formed in 1968, the ceremonial boundaries adjusted while the historic boundaries remained. The Local Government Act 1972 in 1974 further separated the boundaries. The largest settlement is Darlington (92,363) followed by Hartlepool (88,855) and Stockton-on-Tees (82,729).

Toponymy 

The ceremonial county is officially named Durham, but the county has long been commonly known as County Durham and is the only English county name prefixed with "County" in common usage (a practice common in Ireland). Its unusual naming (for an English shire) is explained to some extent by the relationship with the Bishops of Durham, who for centuries governed Durham as a county palatine (the County Palatine of Durham) outside the usual structure of county administration in England.

The situation regarding the formal name in modern local government is less clear:
The 2009 structural change legislation created the present unitary council (that covers a large part – but not all – of the ceremonial county) refers to "the county of County Durham" and names the new unitary district "County Durham" too. 
Later amendment to that legislation refers to the "county of Durham" and the amendment allows for the unitary council to name itself "The Durham Council". 
The council retains the name as Durham County Council. With either option, the name does not include County Durham.
The former postal county was named "County Durham" to distinguish it from the post town of Durham.

History

Anglian Kingdom of Bernicia

Around AD 547, an Angle named Ida founded the kingdom of Bernicia after spotting the defensive potential of a large rock at Bamburgh, upon which many a fortification was thenceforth built. Ida was able to forge, hold and consolidate the kingdom; although the native British tried to take back their land, the Angles triumphed and the kingdom endured.

Kingdom of Northumbria

In AD 604, Ida's grandson Æthelfrith forcibly merged Bernicia (ruled from Bamburgh) and Deira (ruled from York, which was known as Eforwic at the time) to create the Kingdom of Northumbria. In time, the realm was expanded, primarily through warfare and conquest; at its height, the kingdom stretched from the River Humber (from which the kingdom drew its name) to the Forth. Eventually, factional fighting and the rejuvenated strength of neighbouring kingdoms, most notably Mercia, led to Northumbria's decline. The arrival of the Vikings hastened this decline, and the Scandinavian raiders eventually claimed the Deiran part of the kingdom in AD 867 (which became Jórvík). The land that would become County Durham now sat on the border with the Great Heathen Army, a border which today still (albeit with some adjustments over the years) forms the boundaries between Yorkshire and County Durham.

Despite their success south of the river Tees, the Vikings never fully conquered the Bernician part of Northumbria, despite the many raids they had carried out on the kingdom. However, Viking control over the Danelaw, the central belt of Anglo-Saxon territory, resulted in Northumbria becoming isolated from the rest of Anglo-Saxon Britain. Scots invasions in the north pushed the kingdom's northern boundary back to the River Tweed, and the kingdom found itself reduced to a dependent earldom, its boundaries very close to those of modern-day Northumberland and County Durham. The kingdom was annexed into England in AD 954.

City of Durham founded

In AD 995, St Cuthbert's community, who had been transporting Cuthbert's remains around, partly in an attempt to avoid them falling into the hands of Viking raiders, settled at Dunholm (Durham) on a site that was defensively favourable due to the horseshoe-like path of the River Wear. St Cuthbert's remains were placed in a shrine in the White Church, which was originally a wooden structure but was eventually fortified into a stone building.

Once the City of Durham had been founded, the Bishops of Durham gradually acquired the lands that would become County Durham. Bishop Aldhun began this process by procuring land in the Tees and Wear valleys, including Norton, Stockton, Escomb and Aucklandshire in 1018. In 1031, King Canute gave Staindrop to the Bishops. This territory continued to expand, and was eventually given the status of a liberty. Under the control of the Bishops of Durham, the land had various names: the "Liberty of Durham", "Liberty of St Cuthbert's Land" "the lands of St Cuthbert between Tyne and Tees" or "the Liberty of Haliwerfolc" (holy Wear folk).

The bishops' special jurisdiction rested on claims that King Ecgfrith of Northumbria had granted a substantial territory to St Cuthbert on his election to the see of Lindisfarne in 684. In about 883 a cathedral housing the saint's remains was established at Chester-le-Street and Guthfrith, King of York granted the community of St Cuthbert the area between the Tyne and the Wear, before the community reached its final destination in 995, in Durham.

Following the Norman invasion, the administrative machinery of government extended only slowly into northern England. Northumberland's first recorded Sheriff was Gilebert from 1076 until 1080 and a 12th-century record records Durham regarded as within the shire. However the bishops disputed the authority of the sheriff of Northumberland and his officials, despite the second sheriff for example being the reputed slayer of Malcolm Canmore, King of Scots. The crown regarded Durham as falling within Northumberland until the late thirteenth century.

County Palatine of Durham

Matters regarding the bishopric of Durham came to a head in 1293 when the bishop and his steward failed to attend proceedings of quo warranto held by the justices of Northumberland. The bishop's case went before parliament, where he stated that Durham lay outside the bounds of any English shire and that "from time immemorial it had been widely known that the sheriff of Northumberland was not sheriff of Durham nor entered within that liberty as sheriff. . . nor made there proclamations or attachments". The arguments appear to have prevailed, as by the fourteenth century Durham was accepted as a liberty which received royal mandates direct. In effect it was a private shire, with the bishop appointing his own sheriff. The area eventually became known as the "County Palatine of Durham".

Sadberge was a liberty, sometimes referred to as a county, within Northumberland. In 1189 it was purchased for the see but continued with a separate sheriff, coroner and court of pleas. In the 14th century Sadberge was included in Stockton ward and was itself divided into two wards. The division into the four wards of Chester-le-Street, Darlington, Easington and Stockton existed in the 13th century, each ward having its own coroner and a three-weekly court corresponding to the hundred court. The diocese was divided into the archdeaconries of Durham and Northumberland. The former is mentioned in 1072, and in 1291 included the deaneries of Chester-le-Street, Auckland, Lanchester and Darlington.

The term palatinus is applied to the bishop in 1293, and from the 13th century onwards the bishops frequently claimed the same rights in their lands as the king enjoyed in his kingdom.

Early administration

Overview

The historic boundaries of County Durham included a main body covering the catchment of the Pennines in the west, the River Tees in the south, the North Sea in the east and the Rivers Tyne and Derwent in the north. The county palatinate also had a number of liberties: the Bedlingtonshire, Islandshire and Norhamshire exclaves within Northumberland, and the Craikshire exclave within the North Riding of Yorkshire. These exclaves were included as part of the county for parliamentary electoral purposes until 1832, and for judicial and local-government purposes until the coming into force of the Counties (Detached Parts) Act 1844, which merged most remaining exclaves with their surrounding county. The boundaries of the county proper remained in use for administrative and ceremonial purposes until the 1972 Local Government Act.

The Early English and Norman period 

Following the Battle of Hastings, William the Conqueror appointed Copsig as Earl of Northumbria, thereby bringing what would become County Durham under Copsig's control. Copsig was, just a few weeks later, killed in Newburn. Having already being previously offended by the appointment of a non-Northumbrian as Bishop of Durham in 1042, the people of the region became increasingly rebellious. In response, in January 1069, William despatched a large Norman army, under the command of Robert de Comines, to Durham City. The army, believed to consist of 700 cavalry (about one-third of the number of Norman knights who had participated in the Battle of Hastings), entered the city, whereupon they were attacked, and defeated, by a Northumbrian assault force. The Northumbrians wiped out the entire Norman army, including Comines, all except for one survivor, who was allowed to take the news of this defeat back.

Following the Norman slaughter at the hands of the Northumbrians, resistance to Norman rule spread throughout Northern England, including a similar uprising in York. William The Conqueror subsequently (and successfully) attempted to halt the northern rebellions by unleashing the notorious Harrying of the North (1069–1070). Because William's main focus during the harrying was on Yorkshire, County Durham was largely spared the Harrying. The best remains of the Norman period include Durham Cathedral and Durham Castle, and several parish churches, such as St Laurence Church in Pittington. The Early English period has left the eastern portion of the cathedral, the churches of Darlington, Hartlepool, and St Andrew, Auckland, Sedgefield, and portions of a few other churches.

11th to 15th centuries 

Until the 15th century, the most important administrative officer in the Palatinate was the steward. Other officers included the sheriff, the coroners, the Chamberlain and the chancellor. The palatine exchequer originated in the 12th century. The palatine assembly represented the whole county, and dealt chiefly with fiscal questions. The bishop's council, consisting of the clergy, the sheriff and the barons, regulated judicial affairs, and later produced the Chancery and the courts of Admiralty and Marshalsea.

The prior of Durham ranked first among the bishop's barons. He had his own court, and almost exclusive jurisdiction over his men. A UNESCO site describes the role of the Prince-Bishops in Durham, the "buffer state between England and Scotland":From 1075, the Bishop of Durham became a Prince-Bishop, with the right to raise an army, mint his own coins, and levy taxes. As long as he remained loyal to the king of England, he could govern as a virtually autonomous ruler, reaping the revenue from his territory, but also remaining mindful of his role of protecting England’s northern frontier.

A report states that the Bishops also had the authority to appoint judges and barons and to offer pardons.

There were ten palatinate barons in the 12th century, most importantly the Hyltons of Hylton Castle, the Bulmers of Brancepeth, the Conyers of Sockburne, the Hansards of Evenwood, and the Lumleys of Lumley Castle. The Nevilles owned large estates in the county. John Neville, 3rd Baron Neville de Raby rebuilt Raby Castle, their principal seat, in 1377.

Edward I's quo warranto proceedings of 1293 showed twelve lords enjoying more or less extensive franchises under the bishop. The repeated efforts of the Crown to check the powers of the palatinate bishops culminated in 1536 in the Act of Resumption, which deprived the bishop of the power to pardon offences against the law or to appoint judicial officers. Moreover, indictments and legal processes were in future to run in the name of the king, and offences to be described as against the peace of the king, rather than that of the bishop. In 1596 restrictions were imposed on the powers of the chancery, and in 1646 the palatinate was formally abolished. It was revived, however, after the Restoration, and continued with much the same power until 5 July 1836, when the Durham (County Palatine) Act 1836 provided that the palatine jurisdiction should in future be vested in the Crown.

15th century to the modern era 

During the 15th-century Wars of the Roses, Henry VI passed through Durham. On the outbreak of the Great Rebellion in 1642 Durham inclined to support the cause of the Parliament, and in 1640 the high sheriff of the palatinate guaranteed to supply the Scottish army with provisions during their stay in the county. In 1642 the Earl of Newcastle formed the western counties into an association for the King's service, but in 1644 the palatinate was again overrun by a Scottish army, and after the Battle of Marston Moor (2 July 1644) fell entirely into the hands of the parliament.

In 1614, a bill was introduced in parliament for securing representation to the county and city of Durham and the borough of Barnard Castle. The bishop strongly opposed the proposal as an infringement of his palatinate rights, and the county was first summoned to return members to parliament in 1654. After the Restoration of 1660 the county and city returned two members each. In the wake of the Reform Act of 1832 the county returned two members for two divisions, and the boroughs of Gateshead, South Shields and Sunderland acquired representation. The bishops lost their secular powers in 1836. The boroughs of Darlington, Stockton and Hartlepool returned one member each from 1868 until the Redistribution Act of 1885.

'Durham Castle and Cathedral' is a designated UNESCO World Heritage Site. Other attractions in the County include; Auckland Castle, North of England Lead Mining Museum and Beamish Museum.

Modern government

The Municipal Corporations Act 1835 reformed the municipal boroughs of Durham, Stockton on Tees and Sunderland. In 1875, Jarrow was incorporated as a municipal borough, as was West Hartlepool in 1887. At a county level, the Local Government Act 1888 reorganised local government throughout England and Wales. Most of the county came under control of the newly formed Durham County Council in an area known as an administrative county. Not included were the county boroughs of Gateshead, South Shields and Sunderland. However, for purposes other than local government, the administrative county of Durham and the county boroughs continued to form a single county to which the Crown appointed a Lord Lieutenant of Durham.

Over its existence, the administrative county lost territory, both to the existing county boroughs, and because two municipal boroughs became county boroughs: West Hartlepool in 1902 and Darlington in 1915. The county boundary with the North Riding of Yorkshire was adjusted in 1967: that part of the town of Barnard Castle historically in Yorkshire was added to County Durham, while the administrative county ceded the portion of the Borough of Stockton-on-Tees in Durham to the North Riding. In 1968, following the recommendation of the Local Government Commission, Billingham was transferred to the County Borough of Teesside, in the North Riding. In 1971, the population of the county—including all associated county boroughs (an area of )—was 1,409,633, with a population outside the county boroughs of 814,396.

In 1974, the Local Government Act 1972 abolished the administrative county and the county boroughs, reconstituting County Durham as a non-metropolitan county. The reconstituted County Durham lost territory to the north-east (around Gateshead, South Shields and Sunderland) to Tyne and Wear and to the south-east (around Hartlepool) to Cleveland. At the same time it gained the former area of Startforth Rural District from the North Riding of Yorkshire. The area of the Lord Lieutenancy of Durham was also adjusted by the Act to coincide with the non-metropolitan county (which occupied  in 1981).

In 1996, as part of 1990s UK local government reform by Lieutenancies Act 1997, Cleveland was abolished. Its districts were reconstituted as unitary authorities. Hartlepool and Stockton-on-Tees (north Tees) were returned to the county for the purposes of Lord Lieutenancy. Darlington also became a third unitary authority of the county. The Royal Mail abandoned the use of postal counties altogether, permitted but not mandatory being at a writer wishes.

As part of the 2009 structural changes to local government in England initiated by the Department for Communities and Local Government, the seven district councils within the County Council area were abolished. The County Council assumed their functions and became the fourth unitary authority. Changes came into effect on 1 April 2009.

On 15 April 2014, North East Combined Authority was established under the Local Democracy, Economic Development and Construction Act 2009 with powers over economic development and regeneration. In November 2018, Newcastle City Council, North Tyneside Borough Council, and Northumberland County Council left the authority. These later formed the North of Tyne Combined Authority.

In May 2021, four parish councils of the villages of Elwick, Hart, Dalton Piercy and Greatham all issued individual votes of no confidence in Hartlepool Borough Council, and expressed their desire to join the County Durham district.

In October 2021, County Durham was shortlisted for the UK City of Culture 2025. In May 2022, it lost to Bradford.

Geography

Geology

County Durham is underlain by Carboniferous rocks in the west. Permian and Triassic strata overlie these older rocks in the east. These sedimentary sequences have been cut by igneous dykes and sills.

Climate

The following climate figures were gathered at the Durham weather station between 1981 and 2010:

Green belt

County Durham contains a small area of green belt in the north of the county, surrounding primarily the city of Durham, Chester-le-Street and other communities along the shared county border with Tyne and Wear, to afford protection from the Wearside conurbation. A smaller green belt separates Urpeth, Ouston, Pelton, and Perkinsville from Birtley in Tyne and Wear. A further small segment by the coast separates Seaham from the Sunderland settlements of Beckwith Green and Ryhope. It was first drawn up in the 1990s.

North Pennines

The county contains a sizeable area of the North Pennines, designated an Area of Outstanding Natural Beauty, primarily west of Tow Law and Barnard Castle. The highest point (county top) of historic County Durham is the trig point (not the summit) of Burnhope Seat, height , between Weardale and Teesdale on the border with historic Cumberland in the far west of the county. The local government reorganisation of 1974 placed the higher Mickle Fell south of Teesdale (the county top of Yorkshire) within the administrative borders of Durham (where it remains within the ceremonial county). However, it is not generally recognised as the highest point in Durham.

The two main dales of County Durham (Teesdale and Weardale) and the surrounding fells, many of which exceed  in height, are excellent hillwalking country, although not nearly as popular as the nearby Yorkshire Dales and Lake District national parks. The scenery is rugged and remote, and the high fells have a landscape typical of the Pennines with extensive areas of tussock grass and blanket peat bog in the west, with heather moorland on the lower slopes descending to the east. Hamsterley Forest near Crook is a popular recreational area for local residents.

Birds
A total of 152 species are recorded as breeding; however, not all are considered regular breeders.

Urban areas
County Durham does not have many urban areas as it is mostly rural in character. Small urban areas form around the city of Durham and the towns of Newton Aycliffe, Peterlee, Shildon, Darlington and Bishop Auckland. Although the south east side of the county at Billingham, Hartlepool, Norton and Stockton-on-Tees form part of Teesside with Middlesbrough, Redcar, Yarm, Thornaby-on-Tees and Ingleby Barwick in North Yorkshire. While the north part of the county at Chester-le-Street (which is on the border with Tyne and Wear) forms part of Wearside with Sunderland, Houghton-le-Spring, Hetton-le-Hole and Washington (these four were historically part of County Durham).

Governance 

County Durham, as considered a county for lieutenancy purposes by the Lieutenancies Act 1997, is administered as a part of the constituent country of England in the United Kingdom. The area is appointed a lord lieutenant and a high sheriff. 

The ceremonial county is divided into four administrative counties (see table below), one of which - Stockon-on-Tees - also extends into North Yorkshire. Technically, for administrative purposes, the County of Durham only consists of the area goverened by Durham County Council. The three other areas are counties in their own right.

The county is partially parished. The city of Durham is the most populous settlement in the county to have a parish. Multiple parishes are styled as having town councils: Billingham (in Stockton Borough), Barnard Castle, Bishop Auckland, Chilton, Ferryhill, Great Aycliffe, Newton Aycliffe, Greater Willington, Peterlee, Seaham, Sedgefield, Shildon, Spennymoor, Stanley and Tow Law.

1836 to 1889
The county was aligned to other historic counties of England from 1836 until 1889; multiple acts were passed removing exclaves, splitting the county from the bishopric and reforming its structure.

1889 to 1974
The ceremonial county and administrative county were created under the Local Government Act 1888 in 1889. Darlington, Gateshead, West Hartlepool (later known as Hartlepool), South Shields and Sunderland became county boroughs during the administrative counties years of administrating; each remained in the ceremonial county while outside of the administrative county.

The ceremonial county remained under the same borders as the historic county until 1968 when the County Borough of Teesside formed. Ceremonial duties of the borough (which were made up of areas from two counties) were in the North Riding of Yorkshire ceremonial county.

1974 to 1996

From the 1974 until 1996, the ceremonial county was split into eight districts:
Chester-le-Street, including the Lumley, Pelton and Sacriston areas
Derwentside, including Consett and Stanley
City of Durham, including Durham and the surrounding areas
Easington, including Seaham and Peterlee
Borough of Sedgefield, including Spennymoor, Sedgefield and Newton Aycliffe
Teesdale, including Barnard Castle and the villages of Teesdale
Wear Valley, including Bishop Auckland, Crook, Willington, Hunwick, and the villages along Weardale
Borough of Darlington, Darlington along with nearby villages around the town.
A non-metropolitan county replaced the administrative county. The boundaries only deviated from the ceremonial boundaries after 1995 when the Darlington Borough became a unitary authority.

1996 to present
On the 1 April 1996, the county of Cleveland was abolished with its boroughs of Hartlepool and Stockton-on-Tees (north of the River Tees) becoming a part of the ceremonial county.

The non-metropolitan county was reconstituted on 1 April 2009: the strategic services-providing Durham County Council was re-organised into a single district of the same name, merging with the seven local facility-providing districts in the non-metropolitan county and became structured as a unitary authority. It has 126 councillors. The three pre-existing unitary authorities were unaffected.

Parliament

The county boundaries used for parliamentary constituencies are those used between 1974 and 1996, consisting of the County Durham district and the Darlington Borough. This area elects seven Members of Parliament. As of the 2019 General Election, four of these MPs are Conservatives and three MPs are Labour. The rest of the ceremonial county is included in the Cleveland parliamentary constituency area.

Emergency services
The police and fire services operate according to the 1974-96 ceremonial county boundaries:
 Durham Constabulary, Ron Hogg was first elected the Durham Police and Crime Commissioner for the force on 15 November 2012. 
Cleveland Police
 County Durham and Darlington Fire and Rescue Service, it is under supervision of a combined fire authority consisting of 25 local councillors: 21 from Durham County Council and 4 from Darlington Borough Council.
Cleveland Fire Brigade.

The North East Ambulance Service NHS Trust cover North East England and are responsible for providing ambulance services for the NHS. Northumbria Ambulance Service and County Durham Ambulance Service (following historic county borders) merged on 1 April 1999 to become the North East service. In 2005 the area was adapted to the modern North East England regional extent.

Air ambulance services are provided by the Great North Air Ambulance. The charity operates three bases, including one in Eaglecliffe.

Teesdale and Weardale Search and Mountain Rescue Team, are based at Sniperly Farm in Durham City and respond to search and rescue incidents in the county.

Demography

Population

The Office for National Statistics estimated in 2016 that the Durham County Council area had a population of 522,100, the Borough of Darlington a population of 105,600, the Borough of Hartlepool a population of 92,800, and the part of the Borough of Stockton-on-Tees in County Durham (the other part being in North Yorkshire) a population of 137,300. This gives the total estimated population of the ceremonial county at 857,800.

Former non-metropolitan county

At the 2001 Census, Easington and Derwentside districts had the highest proportion (around 99%) in the county council area of resident population who were born in the UK. 13.2% of the county council area's residents rate their health as not good, the highest proportion in England.

96.6% of County Durham's residents are White British, with other white groups making up a further 1.6% of the population. Around 77% of the county's population are Christian whilst 22% have no religion, and around 1% come from other religious communities. These figures exclude around 6% of the population who did not wish to state their religion.

As at 2001, Chester-le-Street district has the lowest number of available jobs per working-age resident (0.38%).

Economy

Economic output
The chart and table summarise unadjusted gross value added (GVA) in millions of pounds sterling for County Durham across 3 industries at current basic prices from 1995 to 2004.

Businesses
Phileas Fogg snacks are made by the United Biscuits subsidiary KP Snacks in Consett on the Number One Industrial Estate. Nearby CAV Aerospace make ice protection systems for aircraft. Thomas Swan, an international chemicals company, is in Crookhall. The Explorer Group, who own Elddis, make caravans at Delves. The LG Philips Displays cathode ray tube factory at Carrville, Durham was the second largest employer in the north east after Nissan, before the company went bankrupt in 2006. Northumbrian Water is in Pity Me, Framwellgate Moor. Esh Group is a large construction company based south of Durham in Bowburn. Schmitz Cargobull UK is the UK's biggest trailer manufacturer, notably for refrigerated trailers, and is based at Harelaw near the Pontop Pike mast.

Black & Decker and Electrolux had large factories at Spennymoor, but moved production overseas. Thorn Lighting of the Zumtobel Lighting Group are on the Green Lane Industrial Estate at Spennymoor. Since 2007 RF Micro Devices (RFMD) have made electronic wafers on the Heighington Lane Business Park at Newton Aycliffe, on the site formerly owned by Fujitsu. Slightly to the north, TKA Tallent make automotive axles and chassis components. Husqvarna-Flymo, formerly owned by Electrolux, are on the Aycliffe Industrial Estate, where the world's first hover mower was built in 1965. In West Auckland, Potters Europe make road reflectors. GlaxoSmithKline has a site at Barnard Castle that makes pharmaceuticals.

NSK make ball bearings on the North West Industrial Estate at Peterlee, and GWA International subsidiary Gliderol UK build garage doors. Mecaplast Group UK produce automotive components on the Low Hills Industrial Estate in Easington Village near Peterlee. Reckitt Benckiser make cough syrup and indigestion remedies at Shotton, near Peterlee until 2014. Walkers Crisps have a site north of Peterlee.

Education

Durham LEA has a comprehensive school system with 36 state secondary schools (not including sixth form colleges) and five independent schools (four in Durham and one in Barnard Castle). Easington district has the largest school population by year, and Teesdale the smallest with two schools. Only one school in Easington and Derwentside districts have sixth forms, with about half the schools in the other districts having sixth forms.

Durham University is based in Durham city and is sometimes held to be the third oldest university in England. Teesside University has a campus in Darlington.

Places of interest 

 Apollo Pavilion, Peterlee, controversial piece of concrete art designed by Victor Pasmore in 1969.
 Auckland Castle, Bishop Auckland 
 Barnard Castle   
 Beamish Museum, in Stanley   
 Binchester Roman Fort 
 Bowes Museum, in Barnard Castle  
 Castle Eden, a castle with adjoining village, famous for the Castle Eden Brewery.
 Castle Eden Dene, Nature reserve with coal mining heritage.
 Causey Arch, near Stanley
 Crook Hall and Gardens
 Durham Cathedral and Castle, a World Heritage Site  
 Durham Dales
 Durham Light Infantry Museum, Aykley Heads, Near Durham 
 Escomb Saxon Church, near Bishop Auckland
 Finchale Priory, near Durham city 
 Fox & Parrot Wood
 Hamsterley Forest
 Hardwick Hall Country Park, near Sedgefield 
 High Force and Low Force waterfalls, on the River Tees 
 Ireshopeburn – oldest Methodist chapel in the world to have held continuous services. Site of the 'Weardale Museum'
 Killhope Wheel, part of the North of England Lead Mining Museum in Weardale 
 Kynren, night show in Bishop Auckland, depicting British History.
 Locomotion railway museum, in Shildon  
 Longovicium Roman Fort, Lanchester – ruined auxiliary fort.
 North of England Institute of Mining and Mechanical Engineers, Newcastle
 Oriental Museum, Durham City – Asian artefacts and information.
 Raby Castle, near Staindrop 
 The Raby Hunt in Summerhouse, the only 2-Michelin Star restaurant in North East England.
 Seaham Hall
 Sedgefield – St Edmund's Church has notable Cosin woodwork. Home to Sedgefield Racecourse.
 Spennymoor - Jubilee park
 Tanfield Railway, in Tanfield 
 Ushaw College, Catholic Seminary of great religious heritage.
 Weardale Railway, at Stanhope, County Durham, Wolsingham and Bishop Auckland

See also
List of Lord Lieutenants of Durham
List of Deputy Lieutenants of Durham
Custos Rotulorum of Durham – Keepers of the Rolls
List of High Sheriffs of Durham
County Durham (UK Parliament constituency) – Historical list of MPs for County Durham constituency

Notes

References

Citations

Sources

Further reading

External links 

 County Durham Lieutenancy
 Visit County Durham
 Visit North East England
 
 
 Images of County Durham at the Historic England Archive

County Durham
Ceremonial counties of England
Counties of England established in 1889